Kulykivka (Kulikovka) is an urban-type settlement in Chernihiv Raion, Chernihiv Oblast of Ukraine. It hosts the administration of Kulykivka settlement hromada, one of the hromadas of Ukraine. Kulykivka was founded in 1650. Population: 

Until 18 July 2020, Kulykivka was the administrative center of Kulykivka Raion. The raion was abolished in July 2020 as part of the administrative reform of Ukraine, which reduced the number of raions of Chernihiv Oblast to five. The area of Kulykivka Raion was merged into Chernihiv Raion.

References

Urban-type settlements in Chernihiv Raion